Ottar Wicklund (3 July 1911 – 13 March 1978) was a Norwegian actor. He made his debut in the film Sangen om Rondane.  He was in over 20 Norwegian films and had his last role in the film Min Marion in (1975). He also had many roles in Radioteatret.

Filmography

1911 births
1978 deaths
Norwegian male film actors
Norwegian male radio actors
20th-century Norwegian male actors